The Breeders' Cup Dirt Mile is a  Weight for Age stakes race for thoroughbred racehorses three years old and up. As its name implies, it is part of the Breeders' Cup World Championships, the de facto year-end championship for North American thoroughbred racing, and is run on a dirt course (either natural dirt or a synthetic surface such as Polytrack). This contrasts with the similar Breeders' Cup Mile, run on grass. All Breeders' Cups to date have been conducted in the United States, with the exception of the 1996 event in Canada.

The race was run for the first time in 2007 during the first day of the expanded Breeders' Cup at that year's host track, Monmouth Park Racetrack in Oceanport, New Jersey. It became a Grade I event in 2009.

Occasionally, various track configurations require minor changes in the distance of the race. The 2015 Breeders' Cup was held at Keeneland, which does not regularly hold 1–mile dirt races. To get the proper distance, the starting gate was set 70 yards (64 m) in front of the one-mile pole, where the timer would start, and the finishing line was set at the track's alternate finish line at the 1⁄16 mile pole. Thus the race was slightly longer than a mile for the horses.

Automatic berths 
In 2007, the Breeders' Cup has developed the Breeders' Cup Challenge, a series of races in each division that allotted automatic qualifying bids to winners of defined races. Each of the fourteen divisions has multiple qualifying races. Note though that one horse may win multiple challenge races, while other challenge winners will not be entered in the Breeders' Cup for a variety of reasons such as injury or travel considerations.

In the Dirt Mile division, runners are limited to 12 and there are three automatic berths. The 2022 "Win and You're In" races were:
 the Metropolitan Handicap, a Grade 1 race run in June at Belmont Park in New York
 the Pat O'Brien Stakes, a Grade 2 race run in August at Del Mar Racetrack in California
 the Ack Ack Stakes, a Grade 3 race run in October at Churchill Downs in Kentucky

Records

Most wins:
 2 – Goldencents (2013, 2014)

Most wins by a jockey:
 2 – Rafael Bejarano (2013, 2014)
 2 – Javier Castellano (2015, 2018)
 2 – Irad Ortiz Jr. (2019, 2021)
 2 – Joel Rosario (2010, 2020)

Most wins by a trainer:
 2 – Jerry Hollendorfer (2010, 2017)
2 – Todd A. Pletcher (2015, 2021)

Most wins by an owner:
 2 – W. C. Racing (2013, 2014)
 2 – WinStar Farm (2017, 2021)

Winners

See also
 Breeders' Cup Dirt Mile "top three finishers" and starters
 American thoroughbred racing top attended events

References

Dirt Mile
Graded stakes races in the United States
Grade 1 stakes races in the United States
Open mile category horse races
Recurring sporting events established in 2007
2007 establishments in New Jersey